The Houston Film Critics Society is a non-profit film critic unincorporated voluntary organization in Houston, Texas, in the United States. The group presents an annual set of film awards for "extraordinary accomplishment in film" in a ceremony held at the Museum of Fine Arts, Houston. The organization includes 40 film critics for print, radio, television, and internet publications in the greater Houston area. It counts San Antonio as an affiliate city and include its eligible critics among the collective.

Organization
The board of directors and officers of the organization, as of 2017, are:
 Doug Harris – President 
 Travis Leamons – Vice President
 Lisa Wellington – Secretary
 Donna Copeland – Treasurer

Awards by year
Houston Film Critics Society Awards 2007
Houston Film Critics Society Awards 2008
Houston Film Critics Society Awards 2009
Houston Film Critics Society Awards 2010
Houston Film Critics Society Awards 2011
Houston Film Critics Society Awards 2012
Houston Film Critics Society Awards 2013
Houston Film Critics Society Awards 2014
Houston Film Critics Society Awards 2015
Houston Film Critics Society Awards 2016
Houston Film Critics Society Awards 2017
Houston Film Critics Society Awards 2018
Houston Film Critics Society Awards 2019
Houston Film Critics Society Awards 2020
Houston Film Critics Society Awards 2021
Houston Film Critics Society Awards 2022

Categories
Best Picture
Best Director
Best Actor
Best Actress
Best Supporting Actor
Best Supporting Actress
Best Screenplay

References

External links

 Official Houston Film Critics Society website

 
American film critics associations
Cinema of Texas
Culture of Houston
Mass media in Houston
Organizations based in Houston